Iván Sánchez-Rico Soto (born 11 August 1980), known as Riki, is a Spanish former footballer who played as a striker.

He spent most of his professional career with Deportivo, appearing in 226 competitive games and scoring 58 goals.

Club career

Early career
Riki was born in Aranjuez, Community of Madrid. After spending his youth career at amateur clubs in the area he played with both Real Madrid's reserve sides, C and B. In July 2004, after having signed an extension the previous year, he was released and moved to another team from the capital, Getafe CF, making his La Liga debut on 12 September 2004 in a 1–2 home defeat to RCD Mallorca. 

On 13 March 2005, Riki scored against his former employer in a 2–1 home victory. In his second season, he netted eight league goals.

Deportivo
In late June 2006, Riki moved to Deportivo de La Coruña on a five-year contract. During his first year he was an undisputed starter and, the following campaign, he featured less prominently, but scored two more goals (five).

In the first game of the 2008–09 season, against Real Madrid, Riki was stretchered off the pitch with a hamstring injury, ironically after having subbed in himself. He was out of action for two weeks, subsequently netting on 2 November 2008 in a 3–0 away defeat of Real Betis.

Riki again suffered physical problems in the following season, but made the most of his 1,492 minutes as he scored eight goals, notably netting in the first round, a 2–3 loss at Real Madrid, and in both matches against Xerez CD (3–0 away, 2–1 at home); the Galicians eventually finished in tenth position.

After his team's relegation in 2011, Riki scored 14 times as they bounced back as champions of the second division, including early strikes in home and away victories over RC Celta de Vigo in the Galician derby.

Later years
When Deportivo were immediately relegated, Riki ended his seven-year tenure to remain in the top flight at Granada CF for the next three seasons. He did not score for the Andalusians until 14 December 2013 in a 2–0 win at Rayo Vallecano, and added only one more goal in a 3–3 draw on his return to Getafe.

On 31 August 2015, the 35-year-old Riki dropped down two levels to sign a two-year deal at CD Guadalajara. He left at the end of the campaign, however, having been relegated from Segunda División B.

International career
Riki was not capped by Spain at any level. He played for the Madrid autonomous team on their Football Federation's centenary on 7 June 2013, scoring a penalty in a 2–1 loss to Andalusia in Vallecas.

Honours
Deportivo
UEFA Intertoto Cup: 2008
Segunda División: 2011–12

References

External links

1980 births
Living people
People from Aranjuez
Spanish footballers
Footballers from the Community of Madrid
Association football forwards
La Liga players
Segunda División players
Segunda División B players
Tercera División players
Real Madrid C footballers
Real Madrid Castilla footballers
Real Madrid CF players
Getafe CF footballers
Deportivo de La Coruña players
Granada CF footballers
CD Guadalajara (Spain) footballers